Hypoprepia fucosa, the painted lichen moth, is a moth of the family Erebidae. The species was first described by Jacob Hübner in 1831. It is found in the United States and southern Canada east of the Rocky Mountains.

The wingspan is 25–35 mm. Adults are on wing from May to August in the north and  possibly most of the year in Florida.

The larvae feed on lichen, algae and moss on trees.

Subspecies
Hypoprepia fucosa subornata
Hypoprepia fucosa tricolor

References

Fauske, Gerald M. (January 23, 2007). "Hypoprepia fucosa Hübner [1831"]. Moths of North Dakota. Retrieved October 4, 2019.

Cisthenina
Moths of North America
Moths described in 1831